Sun Zongwei (July 1912 – May 1979) was a Chinese painter. His artwork was part of the painting event in the art competition at the 1948 Summer Olympics.

References

External links
 

1912 births
1979 deaths
20th-century Chinese painters
Chinese painters
Olympic competitors in art competitions
People from Changzhou